Out of the Frying Pan and into the Firing Line is a 1942 American animated short film produced by Walt Disney Productions. It was distributed in Technicolor by the War Activities Committee of the Motion Pictures Industry.

History 
In 1941, after the sudden attack on Pearl Harbor, The United States Army moved into the Walt Disney Studio and demanded WWII propaganda films, which told the general public about the strength of the US army, the terribleness of the Nazis and how people staying at home could help in the war effort. Some of the most popular shorts released during this time in Disney history were Reason and Emotion and Education for Death, among others.

Plot 
Out of the Frying Pan and into the Firing Line starred Minnie and Pluto and teaches the house wives of the 1940s the importance of saving fat and grease.

References

External links
Walt Disney's World War II propaganda production#Propaganda productions

1942 films
Films directed by Jack King
1940s Disney animated short films
American World War II propaganda films
1942 short films
Pluto (Disney) short films